"That's What It's Like to Be Lonesome" is a song written and recorded by American country singer-songwriter Bill Anderson. It was released as a single in December 1958 via Decca Records and became a major hit. A similar version was released by American country artist Ray Price the same year via Columbia Records.

Bill Anderson version
"That's What It's Like to Be Lonesome" was recorded at the Bradley Studio, located in Nashville, Tennessee. The sessions were produced by Owen Bradley, who would serve as Anderson's producer through most of years with Decca Records.

"That's What It's Like to Be Lonesome" was released as a single by Decca Records in December 1958. It spent a total of 17 weeks on the Billboard Hot Country and Western Sides chart before reaching number 12 in February 1959. It became Anderson's first major hit as a music artist and his first charting record. It was not first released on a proper album. However, seven years later, it appeared on his compilation From This Pen.

Track listings
7" vinyl single<ref>{{cite web |title=Bill Anderson -- That's What It's Like to Be Lonesome" (1958, Vinyl) |url=https://www.discogs.com/Bill-Anderson-Thats-What-Its-Like-To-Be-Lonesome-The-Thrill-Of-My-Life/release/14241289 |website=Discogs |accessdate=21 July 2020}}</ref>
 "That's What It's Like to Be Lonesome" – 2:30
 "The Thrill of My Life" – 2:25

Chart performance

Ray Price version

"That's What It's Like to Be Lonesome" was recorded at the Columbia Studio, located in Nashville, Tennessee. The sessions were produced by Don Law.

"That's What It's Like to Be Lonesome" was released as a single by Columbia Records in December 1958. It spent a total of 19 weeks on the Billboard'' Hot Country and Western Sides chart before reaching number 7 in February 1959. It was one of many top ten hits for Price on the Columbia label and was followed by several number one hits as well. It was not first released on a proper album.

Track listings
7" vinyl single
 "That's What It's Like to Be Lonesome" – 2:44
 "Kissing Your Picture Is So Cold" – 2:39

Chart performance

References

1958 singles
1958 songs
Bill Anderson (singer) songs
Decca Records singles
Columbia Records singles
Song recordings produced by Owen Bradley
Songs written by Bill Anderson (singer)
Ray Price (musician) songs